Daniel Kevin McMillan (born April 26, 1967) is an American college basketball coach and the current women's head coach at the University of Tennessee at Martin (UT Martin). The UT Martin Skyhawks are members of the Ohio Valley Conference and compete in the NCAA Division I.

Head coaching record

Source:

References 

1967 births
Living people
American women's basketball coaches
High school basketball coaches in the United States
Middle Tennessee Blue Raiders women's basketball coaches
UT Martin Skyhawks women's basketball coaches
Rhodes College alumni
UT Martin Skyhawks athletic directors
Wake Forest Demon Deacons men's basketball players
American men's basketball players
Forwards (basketball)